Jin-hwan is a Korean masculine given name. The meaning differs based on the hanja used to write each syllable of the given name. There are 43 hanja with the reading "jin" and 21 hanja with the reading "hwan" on the South Korean government's official list of hanja which may be used in given names.

People with this name include:
Shinjiro Hiyama (born Hwang Jin-hwan, 1968), Zainichi Korean baseball player
Shon Jin-hwan (born 1968), South Korean badminton player
Kim Jin-hwan (footballer) (born 1989), South Korean football defender

See also
List of Korean given names

References

Korean masculine given names